Shani Anderson was born on 7 August 1975 in St Vincent and was a resident of Catford, London.

She competed in the 2000 Sydney Olympics in the 4 × 100 m relay and the 100m.

Shani now coaches athletics from club to Olympic level and started her own personal training company, Anderson Fitness Consultants. She has a personal training studio at The Armitage on Great Portland Street where she trains clients and she also runs corporate health & wellbeing events and programmes.

She was educated in Dulwich, South London at James Allen's Girls' School.

References

Living people
English female sprinters
1975 births
People educated at James Allen's Girls' School
Athletes (track and field) at the 2000 Summer Olympics
Olympic athletes of Great Britain
Athletes from London
Athletes (track and field) at the 2002 Commonwealth Games
Commonwealth Games medallists in athletics
Commonwealth Games bronze medallists for England
Saint Vincent and the Grenadines emigrants to the United Kingdom
People from Catford
Olympic female sprinters
Medallists at the 2002 Commonwealth Games